The Good Immigrant is an anthology of twenty-one essays edited by Nikesh Shukla and first published by Unbound in the UK in 2016 after a crowd-funding campaign endorsed by celebrities. Written by British authors who identify as BAME (Black, Asian and Minority Ethnic), the essays concern race, immigration, identity, 'otherness', exploring the experience of immigrant and ethnic minority life in the United Kingdom from their perspective. Contributors include actor/musician Riz Ahmed, journalist Reni Eddo-Lodge, comedian Nish Kumar and playwright Vinay Patel. The compilation inspired the American sequel The Good Immigrant USA, published in 2017, which featured BAME authors from the United States.

Summary 
The Good Immigrant is a book of 21 essays by BAME writers, described by Sandeep Parmar in The Guardian as "an unflinching dialogue about race and racism in the UK", which aims to "document… what it means to be a person of colour now" in light of what Shukla notes in the book's foreword "the backwards attitude to immigration and refugees [and] the systematic racism that runs through [Britain]". Written by twenty-one British authors of Black, Asian and Minority Ethnic (BAME) backgrounds, The Good Immigrant explores the personal and universal experiences of immigrant and ethnic minority life in the United Kingdom. Shukla's book tells stories of "anger, displacement, defensiveness, curiosity, absurdity" as well as "death, class, microaggression, popular culture, access, freedom of movement, stake in society, lingual fracas, masculinity, and more".

Contributors 
 Nikesh Shukla Namaste
 Varaidzo A Guide to Being Black
 Chimene Suleyman My Name is My Name
 Vera Chok Yellow
 Daniel York Loh Kendo Nagasaki and Me
 Himesh Patel Window of Opportunity
 Nish Kumar Is Nish Kumar a Confused Muslim?
 Reni Eddo-Lodge Forming Blackness Through a Screen
 Wei Ming Kam Beyond 'Good' Immigrants
 Darren Chetty You Can't Say That! Stories Have to Be About White People
 Kieran Yates On Going Home
 Coco Khan Flags
 Inua Ellams Cutting Through (On Black Barbershops and Masculinity)
 Sabrina Mahfouz Wearing Where You're At: Immigrant and U.K. Fashion
 Riz Ahmed Airports and Auditions
 Sarah Sahim Perpetuating Casteism
 Salena Godden Shade
 Miss L The Wife of a Terrorist
 Bim Adewunmi What We Talk About When We Talk About Tokenism
 Vinay Patel Death is a Many Headed Monster 
 Musa Okwonga The Ungrateful Country

Reception 
David Barnett's review in British newspaper The Independent openly praised the political nature of the book, saying: "The stories are sometimes funny, sometimes brutal, always honest. If you find them shocking, it's probably because you're white, like me, and don't have to live with any of this every single day of the week. And for that reason, if I could, I'd push a copy of this through the letter box of every front door in Britain."

Similarly, another review written by Sandeep Parmar for The Guardian judged the book as "an unflinching dialogue about race and racism in the UK" continuing to say "We should recognise both the courage that has been shown in producing these essays and the contradictions that necessarily exist across them. While, inevitably, some are better crafted and more convincing than others, The Good Immigrant helps to open up a much-needed space of open and unflinching dialogue about race and racism in the UK."

Arifa Akbar, writing in The Financial Times thought that JK Rowling's involvement (and that of other cultural leaders) in fund raising for the collection contained "whisperings of white saviourism" but that despite that, "the book reads like an uncompromised work" that summarises "experiences of racism or racial pigeonholing".

The book reached the top-10 non-fiction charts in both UK and US editions and was number #1 on Amazon non-fiction in the UK for a short period.

It was voted the winner in the Books Are My Bag Readers Awards.

Crowdfunding 
In an interview at the Edinburgh Festival, Shukla stressed that the inception of this book was borne from "gatekeeping" within the publishing industry and a desire to see diverse opinions on bookshelves rather than just diversity panels. To achieve this, Shukla worked with Unbound, a British publishing house which utilises crowdfunding to enable the publication of "books readers want". In an interview with multi-national newspaper The Guardian, Unbound's co-founder John Mitchinson stated that crowdfunding means that "the handwringing that usually surrounds this issue is replaced by positive action on the part of both contributors and potential readers."

The Good Immigrant reached its funding target in just three days after receiving public support from the notable authors J.K. Rowling, David Nicholls, Jonathan Coe and Evie Wyld who were amongst the book's 470 supporters. Rowling has received a dedication in the book, after her public support of The Good Immigrant with a tweet which stated that it was "an important, timely read". Nicholls also publicly endorsed The Good Immigrant stating that "I did want to support the project because it's an important subject, and not something I know enough about."

Sequel - The Good Immigrant USA (2019) 
Following the success of The Good Immigrant, Nikesh Shukla and Chimene Suleyman solicited contributions from American minority writers, actors, comedians, directors, and artists. The Good Immigrant USA - 26 writers reflect on America was published by Dialogue Books in 2019, and includes the contributions of twenty-six Americans of colour.

Contributors 
 Porochista Khakpour How to Write Iranian-America, or The Last Essay
 Nicole Dennis-Benn Swimmer
 Rahawa Haile Sidra (in 12 Movements)
 Teju Cole On the Blackness of the Panther
 Priya Minhas How Not to Be
 Walé Oyéjidé After Migration: The Once and Future Kings Fatimah Asghar On Loneliness Tejal Rao Chooey-Booey and Brown Maeve Higgins Luck of the Irish Krutika Mallikarjuna Her Name Was India Jim St. Germain Shithole Nation Jenny Zhang Blond Girls in Cheongsams Chigozie Obioma The Naked Man Alexander Chee Your Father's Country Yann Demange The Long Answer Jean Hannah Edelstein An American, Told Chimene Suleyman On Being Kim Kardashian Basim Usmani Tour Diary Daniel José Older Dispatches from the Language Wars Adrián Villar Rojas and Sebastián Villar Rojas Juana Azurduy Versus Christopher Columbus Dani Fernandez (author) No Es Suficiente Fatima Farheen Mirza Skittles Susanne Ramírez de Arellano Return to Macondo Mona Chalabi 244 Million Jade Chang How to Center Your Own Story The Good Immigrant - The Netherlands (2020) 
In The Netherlands, crowdfunding for a Dutch version of The Good Immigrant by podcast Dipsaus (Anousha Nzume, Ebissé Wakjira and Mariam El Maslouhi) was successfully finished in March 2020. The book itself, De goede immigrant - 23 visies op Nederland'' was published by Dipsaus and publisher Pluim in August 2020 (editor-in-chief Sayonara Stutgard). The book was inspired by the original UK edition and isn't an official follow-up.

Contributors 
 Quinsy Gario
 Manju Reijmer
 Nina Köll
 Clark Accord
 Sarah Bekkali
 Mojdeh Feili
 Jeanette Chedda 
 Richard Kofi
 Khadija Boujbira
 Simone Zeefuik
 Olave Nduwanje
 Tirsa With
 Dino Suhonic
 Mia You
 Hasret Emine
 Zaïre Krieger
 Deborah Cameron
 Karwan Fatah-Black
 Yael van der Wouden
 Rita Ouédraogo
 Zouhair Hammana
 Nancy Jouwe
 Fatima Faïd

References 

2016 anthologies
Non-fiction books about immigration to Europe
Essay anthologies
Books about race and ethnicity
2016 non-fiction books
Indian diaspora in the United Kingdom